The Gradeshnitsa tablets or plaques are clay artefacts with incised marks. They were unearthed in 1969 near the village of Gradeshnitsa in the Vratsa Province of north-western Bulgaria.  Steven Fischer has written that "the current opinion is that these earliest Balkan symbols appear to comprise a decorative or emblematic inventory with no immediate relation to articulate speech." That is, they are neither logographs (whole-word signs depicting one object to be spoken aloud) nor phonographs (signs holding a purely phonetic or sound value)." The tablets are dated to the 4th millennium BC and are currently preserved in the Vratsa Archeological Museum of Bulgaria.

See also
Cucuteni-Trypillian culture
Sinaia lead plates
Tărtăria tablets
Prehistory of Southeastern Europe

Further reading
Ivan Raikinski (ed.), Catalogue of the Vratsa Museum of History, 1990.

External links

References

4th-millennium BC works
1969 archaeological discoveries
Archaeology of Bulgaria
Inscriptions in undeciphered writing systems
Prehistory of Southeastern Europe
Proto-writing
Vinča culture